Sylvain Tesson (born 26 April 1972) is a French writer and traveller born in Paris. He has engaged in a number of unusual travels and expeditions which are the basis for his books. For the latter book he received the Prix Renaudot.

Early life
Sylvain Tesson is the son of Marie-Claude Tesson and the journalist Philippe Tesson who founded the French newspaper Le Quotidien de Paris. His sisters are the actress Stephanie Tesson and the art journalist Daphne Tesson. He is a geographer by background and holds a degree in geopolitics.

Travels and writing 
In 1991, he crossed central Iceland on a motorcycle, and then took part in a cave exploration in Borneo. In 1993 and 1994, he toured the world by bicycle with Alexandre Poussin, whom he had known since secondary school. The two friends then completed their studies in geography. He wrote about the trip in 1996, in the book On a roulé sur la terre, for which he received the youth IGN prize.

Again with Poussin, in 1997 he crossed the Himalaya by foot, a five-month journey of 5000 kilometers from Bhutan to Tajikistan. He and Poussin then collaborated on the book La Marche dans le ciel: 5000 km à pied à travers l'Himalaya in 1998. In 1999 and 2000, he and photographer Priscilla Telmon crossed the steppes of central Asia from Kazakhstan to Uzbekistan on horseback. That trip led to two books: La Chevauchée des steppes in 2001, and Carnets de Steppes: à cheval à travers l'Asie centrale in 2002. In 2001 and 2002, he participated in archeological expeditions in Pakistan and Afghanistan.

From May 2003 to January 2004, he followed the route allegedly used by Sławomir Rawicz to escape the gulag as Rawicz described in his book, The Long Walk (1955). Rawicz travelled from Yakutsk in Siberia to Calcutta in India on foot. Tesson concluded the journey was plausible, though there are inconsistencies, such as Rawicz's claim of ten days without water in the Gobi. Tesson wrote a book with photographer Thomas Goisque based on this experience, Sous l'étoile de la liberté. Six mille kilomètres à travers l'Eurasie sauvage ("Under the star of liberty. Six thousand kilometers across the Eurasian wild.")

In 2010, Tesson undertook a project to live alone for six months on the shores of Lake Baikal in a rustic cabin during winter, about 50 km north of Irkutsk. In his own words, "the recipe for happiness: a window on Baikal, a table by the window". He recounted his time in Siberia in a book The Consolations of the Forest: Alone in a Cabin on the Siberian Taiga. It won the 2014 Dolman Best Travel Book Award. He also released a film titled Alone, 180 days on Lake Baikal (2011), directed by Tesson and Florence Tran, and the book was adapted into the drama film In the Forests of Siberia (2016), directed by Safy Nebbou and starring Raphaël Personnaz. Between 2011 and 2018 Tseeon was the president of an NGO, La Guilde Européenne du Raid. In 2015 he won the Prix de la Page 112.

On the night of 21 to 22 August 2014, Tesson fell from the roof of a chalet in Chamonix which made him suffer four skull fractures and put him in a coma. He survived and woke up, but was left paralysed on the right half of his face. The accident made him decide to cross France on foot, which became the subject of his travel book  (2016). The book is the basis for the film , starring Jean Dujardin.

Tesson has written two installments of the radio programme and book series Un été avec. He wrote Un été avec Homère about Homer in 2017 and Un été avec Rimbaud about Arthur Rimbaud in 2020.

 came into being when the wildlife photographer Vincent Munier invited Tesson to Tibet to seek out snow leopards. It is Tesson's book about this experience and gave him the 2019 Prix Renaudot. Munier's and Tesson's quest for snow leopards is also the subject of the film The Velvet Queen (2021), which received the César Award for Best Documentary Film.

Selected bibliography
 On a roulé sur la terre (1996)
 La Marche dans le ciel : 5000 km à pied à travers l'Himalaya (1998)
 La Chevauchée des steppes (2001)
 Carnets de Steppes : à cheval à travers l'Asie centrale (2002)
  (2004)
 Sous l'étoile de la Liberté : six mille kilomètres à travers l'Eurasie sauvage (2005)
 The Consolations of the Forest: Alone in a Cabin on the Siberian Taiga (Dans les forêts de Sibérie) (2011; English 2012)
  (Berezina : en side-car avec Napoléon) (2015; English 2019)
  (Sur les chemins noirs) (2016; English 2022)
 Un été avec Homère (2018)
  (La Panthère des neiges) (2019; English 2021)
 Un été avec Rimbaud (2021)
 Une ode à la vie (2022)

Filmography
  (Des manchots et des hommes) (2004, writer: voice-over)
 Un lac en hiver (2005, co-writer and co-director with Sibylle D'Orgeval)
 Alone, 180 Days on Lake Baikal (6 mois de cabane au Baïkal) (2011, writer and co-director with Florence Tran)
 In the Forests of Siberia (Dans les forêts de Sibérie) (2016, source material)
 The Velvet Queen (La Panthère des neiges) (2021, narrator)
  (upcoming, source material)

References

External links
 
 

20th-century French novelists
21st-century French novelists
Tibet freedom activists
French travel writers
French male novelists
French documentary film directors
Prix Médicis essai winners
Prix Goncourt de la nouvelle recipients
Writers from Paris
1972 births
Living people
20th-century French male writers
21st-century French male writers
French male non-fiction writers
Hikers
Prix Renaudot winners